(died 737) was a person in Japan during the Asuka Period and the Nara Period. She was a daughter of Emperor Tenji. Her mother was Lady Kurohime, whose father was Kurikuma no Tokoma. None of her siblings were recorded.

Her detailed biography is not recorded. Ishikawa no Myobu's poem collected in the Man'yōshū is all that records on her in the history. In the Man'yōshū, the Empress Dowager Gensho ordered Ishikawa no Myobu to compose it to express her hope of Princess Minushi's recovery from illness. It was a few years before her death.

Japanese princesses
737 deaths
Year of birth unknown
Daughters of emperors